Maria Lawson (born 1979) is a British singer.

Maria Lawson may also refer to:

 Maria Lawson (album), her eponymous 2006 debut album
 Maria Lawson, actress in The 25th Annual Putnam County Spelling Bee

See also
 Ana Maria Lawson, Miss Maryland Teen USA 2008
 Mary Lawson (disambiguation)